Matija Ban (6 December 1818 – 14 March 1903) was a Serbo-Croatian poet, dramatist, and playwright. He is known as one of the earliest proponents of the Serb-Catholic movement in Dubrovnik.

Ban was born in  near Dubrovnik, then in the Kingdom of Dalmatia in the Austrian Empire, now in Croatia. Matija Ban settled in Serbia in 1844. He is commonly regarded as being the first to use the term "Yugoslav", in a poem in 1835. In 1848 he came from Serbia to Dalmatia to study the state of national sentiment there. He is known for his Romanticist popular tragedies.

See also
 Ignjat Job
 Ivan Stojanović 
 Milan Rešetar 
 Vicko Adamović
 Konstantin Branković

References

Further reading

 Jovan Skerlić, Istorija Nove Srpske Književnosti/ A History of Modern Serbian Literature (Belgrade, 1921), pages 199-201.
 
Njegos.org Short Biography 

1818 births
1903 deaths
People from Dubrovnik
People from the Kingdom of Dalmatia
Serbian dramatists and playwrights
Serbian male poets
Members of the Serbian Academy of Sciences and Arts
Serbs of Croatia
Serb-Catholic movement in Dubrovnik
19th-century poets
19th-century Serbian dramatists and playwrights
Academic staff of the Lyceum of the Principality of Serbia